Daniel Šmiga (born 2 January 2004) is a Czech professional footballer who plays as a forward for Slavia Prague.

Club career
Šmiga began his career at Finstal Lučina and Frýdek-Místek, before joining Baník Ostrava in 2017. On 1 May 2021, at the age of 17 years and 119 days, Šmiga made his debut for Baník Ostrava in a 1–1 draw against Zbrojovka Brno, becoming the youngest player in Baník Ostrava's history. On 22 February 2022, Šmiga signed for Slavia Prague.

International career
Šmiga has represented the Czech Republic at under-15, under-16, under-17 and under-18 level.

References

2004 births
Living people
Czech footballers
Association football forwards
Czech Republic youth international footballers
FC Baník Ostrava players
SK Slavia Prague players
Czech First League players